Pallama is a small town in Puttalam District, located in the North Western Province, Sri Lanka.

See also
List of towns in Central Province, Sri Lanka

References

External links

Populated places in Central Province, Sri Lanka